Crenidens macracanthus is a species of ray-finned fish from the sea bream family Sparidae.

It is found in the Eastern Indian Ocean around India.

References

Iwatsuki, Y. and J. Maclaine, 2013. Validity of Crenidens macracanthus Günther 1874 (Pisces: Sparidae) from Chennai (Madras), India, with taxonomic statuses of the congeners. Ichthyol. Res. (2013)60:241-248

Sparidae
Taxa named by Albert Günther
Fish described in 1874